Cyrtodactylus sworderi, also known commonly as the Johore bow-fingered gecko, the Kota-tinggi forest gecko, and Sworder's bent-toed gecko, is a species of lizard in the family Gekkonidae. The species is endemic to Malaysia.

Etymology
The specific name, sworderi, is in honor of Mr. Hope Sworder, who collected the holotype.

Geographic range
C. sworderi is known from the Malaysian state of Johor.

Habitat
The preferred natural habitats of C. sworderi are desert and freshwater wetlands.

Description

Reproduction
C. sworderi is oviparous.

References

Further reading
Grismer LL, Quah ESH (2019). "An updated and annotated checklist of the lizards of Peninsular Malaysia, Singapore and their adjacent archipelagos". Zootaxa 4545 (2): 230–248.
Grismer LL, Wood PL, Youmans TM (2007). "Redescription of the geckonid lizard Cyrtodactylus sworderi (Smith 1925) from Southern Peninsular Malaysia". Hamadryad 31 (2): 250–257.
Rösler H (2000). "Kommentierte Liste der rezent, subrezent und fossil bekannten Geckotaxa (Reptilia: Gekkonomorpha)". Gekkota 2: 28–153. (Cyrtodactylus sworderi, new combination, p. 67). (in German).
Smith MA (1925). "A new Ground-Gecko (Gymnodactylus) from the Malay Peninsula". Journal of the Malaysian Branch, Royal Asiatic Society, Singapore 3 (1): 87. (Gymnodactylus sworderi, new species).

Cyrtodactylus
Reptiles described in 1925